Samuel Abraham Peyavali "Peya" Mushelenga (born September 01, 1975 in Oshigambo, Ovamboland) is a Namibian politician and poet. He is broadly educated, holding twelve academic qualifications from six different universities.

A member of SWAPO, Mushelenga has been a member of the National Assembly of Namibia since 2005. He has served cabinet in several ministerial roles and is the  minister of Information and Communication Technologies since March 2020.

Early life and education
Peya Mushelenga was born at Oshigambo in the Oshikoto Region of northern Namibia. He attended Oluno Senior Secondary School until 1992 and then entered the University of Namibia (UNAM). 

Mushelenga has accumulated twelve university degrees in his career; the New Era daily called him "Namibia's most avid scholar". He graduated with:
 BA in History and Political Studies, University of Namibia (UNAM), Namibia, 1995
 BA Honours  in International Politics, University of South Africa (UNISA), 1997
 MA in International Politics, UNISA, 2009
 B Juris, UNAM, 2011 
 LLB (Honours), UNAM, 2014 
 D Litt et Phil in International Politics, UNISA, 2015
 BA in Economics, Open University of Tanzania (OUT), 2017
 LLM, UNAM, 2017
 MBA, Eastern and Southern African Management Institute (ESAMI), 2018
 BEd (OUT), 2019
 MSc in Finance, University of London, United Kingdom, 2020
 PhD in Criminal Justice Law, University of the Western Cape, South Africa, 2022

Mushelenga is an admitted legal practitioner (attorney) of the High Court of Namibia.

Career
After his first degree at UNAM Mushelenga worked as teacher at Nehale Senior Secondary School in 1996. He then worked for Government until 1998, and thereafter joined NamPower.

He became active in the Namibia National Students Organisation in the 1980s and eventually became a high-level organizer for the SWAPO Party Youth League, being elected to the Central Committee and National Executive of the SPYL in 1997 and 2002. He had recently led the big delegation of 250 SWAPO Party Youth League leaders to Sochi Russia, to attend the 19th World Festival of Youth and Students, the  event organized by World Federation of Democratic Youth WFDY and the Russian government. Also in 2002, he was elected to the SWAPO Central Committee as its youngest member (re-elected in 2007 and 2012).

Mushelenga became a member of Parliament of Namibia in 2005. In 2010, he was appointed Deputy Minister of Foreign Affairs. In a major cabinet reshuffle he was promoted to Minister of Urban and Rural Development on 8 February 2018. On 21 March 2020, Mushelenga was appointed Minister of Information and Communication Technology.

Personal life 
In 1980, South African security forces killed Mushelenga's sister and injured other relatives during a raid on their family home in the former bantustan of Ovamboland. 

A book of poetry entitled Nando Na Li Toke, written in the Ovambo dialect of Ndonga, was published by Gamsberg MacMillan in 1996.

References

Living people
1975 births
Members of the National Assembly (Namibia)
Namibian poets
People from Oshikoto Region
University of Namibia alumni
Open University of Tanzania alumni
Eastern and Southern African Management Institute alumni
Alumni of the University of London
University of South Africa alumni
University of the Western Cape alumni
SWAPO politicians
Government ministers of Namibia
20th-century Namibian writers
21st-century Namibian writers